The American Star Bicycle was invented in 1880 by G. W. Pressey and manufactured by the H. B. Smith Machine Company in Smithville, Burlington County, New Jersey. It was characterized by a small wheel in front to avoid the problem of tipping forward inherent in other high wheelers. A Star bicycle was photographed being ridden down the steps in front of the United States Capitol in 1885 to demonstrate its longitudinal stability, and Star bicycles were used for the sport of bicycle polo in the mid-1880s. Pressey sued Smith in 1887 for royalties. The name "Star" was attributed to the double star arrangement of the spokes.

Details
The small front wheel,  in diameter, steered, and the large rear wheel,  in diameter, provided the forward driving force and bore most of the rider's weight. The light load on the front wheel was reported to have made it skittish on loose surfaces such as sand and gravel. American Stars incorporated pneumatic tires very soon after they were developed, and braking was provided by a spoon brake acting on the rear wheel and actuated by a lever on the right handlebar.

A pair of independent treadle mechanisms collected power from the rider's legs instead of a crank. Power from each treadle was transferred to the rear wheel by a leather strap over a ratchet mechanism. (See image in gallery below.) The attachment point of the leather strap could be moved to provide multiple gear ratios, and both treadles could be pressed simultaneously for a brief increase in torque. A spring attached to the ratchet rewound the strap when the foot was raised. This treadle arrangement also allowed riders of different sizes to ride the same bike comfortably without modification, as the pedals were not constrained to trace a circle about an axle.

An undated advertisement lists prices from $75 to $120, depending on wheel size and finish, which varied from "plainly finished machine; painted and striped" to "all nickled and polished, except the rim, which is painted and striped in gold."

Variations

Smith also offered tricycles in 1887 and 1888 and patented a steam tricycle in 1889.

At the first Maricopa County Fair in 1884, Lucius Copeland demonstrated his steam bicycle, one of the first motorcycles, a steam-powered Star high-wheeler.

"American Star" was also a brand name used by a Japanese bicycle manufacturer in the 1960s and 1970s.

Songs
The Smith Machine Co. commissioned several musical compositions to promote the American Star Bicycle. In 1882, Chas. W. Nathan composed the Star Bicycle Gallop for piano, and in 1883, John Ford composed The Star Rider. Song & Chorus for piano and voice, which was provided on the back cover of advertisements for American Star Bicycles.

Gallery

See also
List of bicycle types
History of the bicycle

References

External links

Image of a man riding an American Star bicycle in the Jubilee Parade, Enumclaw, 1939 at the Museum of History and Industry
Image of American Star advertisement at Connecticut History Online

Cycle manufacturers of the United States
History of cycling in the United States
Companies based in Burlington County, New Jersey